The 2007 Danish Figure Skating Championships was held in Frederikshavn from December 1 through 3, 2006. Skaters competed in the disciplines of men's singles and ladies' singles. Not all disciplines were held on all levels due to a lack of participants.

Senior results

Men

Ladies

External links
 results

Danish Figure Skating Championships
2006 in figure skating
Danish Figure Skating Championships, 2007
Figure Skating Championships